Anaxyrus compactilis (common name: plateau toad) is a species of toad in the family Bufonidae. It is endemic to Mexico. It is a little known species associated with desert and shrubland.
It is threatened by habitat loss caused by conversion of land for agriculture.

References

Compactilis
Endemic amphibians of Mexico
Amphibians described in 1833
Taxa named by Arend Friedrich August Wiegmann
Taxonomy articles created by Polbot